Sector General is a 1983 science fiction story collection by author James White and is part of the Sector General series. The book includes four stories.

Stories 
"Accident": A major accident at a multi-species spaceport inspires the two heroes who ended the human-Orligian war (MacEwan and Grawlya-Ki) to found Sector General.
"Survivor": A giant snail spacewreck survivor transmits pain and fear while unconscious.
"Investigation": A spacewreck scene seems to indicate amputations from each victim, causing ambulance commander Fletcher to suspect cannibalism.
"Combined Operation": The scene of a spacewreck contains hundreds of pods, which turn out to be a colony ship carrying the last survivors of an alien race.

Reception
Dave Langford reviewed Sector General for White Dwarf #95, and stated that "its foundling, and ever-intuitive Dr Conway struggles with three implausible new varieties of alien patient."

Reviews
Review by Dan Chow (1983) in Locus, #266 March 1983
Review by Tom Easton (1983) in Analog Science Fiction/Science Fact, Mid-September 1983
Review by Terry Broome (1988) in Paperback Inferno, #70

References

1983 short story collections
1980s science fiction works
Science fiction short story collections
Short story collections by James White (author)
Sector General
Del Rey books